Gisum (also Romanized as Gīsūm; also known as Gīsom and Gīsūm-e Bālā) is a village in Khaleh Sara Rural District, Asalem District, Talesh County, Gilan Province, Iran. At the 2006 census, its population was 218, in 44 families.

References 

Populated places in Talesh County